Yadegar (meaning "memorial") may refer to:
Yadegar, Lorestan
Yadegar, Razavi Khorasan
Yadegar-e Olya, Razavi Khorasan Province
Yadegar-e Sofla, Razavi Khorasan Province